The Sangihe whistler or Sangihe shrikethrush (Coracornis sanghirensis) is a species of bird in the family Pachycephalidae. It is endemic to Sangihe Island in Indonesia. Its natural habitat is subtropical or tropical moist montane forests. It is threatened by habitat loss. Originally, the Sangihe shrikethrush was described in the genus Pinarolestes. It was re-classified from the genus Colluricincla to Coracornis in 2013. Alternate names include the Sahengbalira shrike-thrush and Sangir whistler.

References

External links
BirdLife Species Factsheet.

Sangihe whistler
Birds of the Sangihe Islands
Critically endangered fauna of Asia
Sangihe whistler
Taxonomy articles created by Polbot